USS Arcturus may refer to the following ships of the United States Navy:

 , was a  wooden-hulled yacht built in 1911
 , renamed Arcturus on 20 February 1918, probably to avoid confusion with the Army transport Artemis
 , was renamed USS Gold Star (AK-12)
 , was laid down on 26 July 1938 under a Maritime Commission contract
 , was laid down on 8 December 1941 at Oakland, California

United States Navy ship names